The Western Cape Division of the High Court of South Africa (previously named the Cape Provincial Division and the Western Cape High Court, and commonly known as the Cape High Court) is a superior court of law with general jurisdiction over the Western Cape province of South Africa (except for the Murraysburg district which falls within the jurisdiction of the Eastern Cape Division). The division, which sits at Cape Town, consists of 31 judges led by Judge President John Hlophe.

History 

The origins of the Western Cape Division lie in the Supreme Court of the Colony of the Cape of Good Hope, which was established on 1 January 1828 as the highest court of the Cape Colony. It was created by the First Charter of Justice, letters patent issued by George IV on 24 August 1827. Upon the creation of the Union of South Africa in 1910, the Supreme Court of the Cape Colony was transformed by the South Africa Act 1909 into the Cape of Good Hope Provincial Division of the new Supreme Court of South Africa.

Originally the Cape Division had jurisdiction over the whole of the Cape Province, although concurrently with the Eastern Cape (Grahamstown) and Griqualand West (Kimberley) Local Divisions in their areas of jurisdiction. However, in 1957 the Eastern Cape division was elevated to the status of a provincial division, and in 1969 the Griqualand West division was similarly elevated, becoming the Northern Cape Division. Upon elevation these divisions became independent from the Cape Division.

When the final Constitution of South Africa came into force in 1997, the Cape of Good Hope Division of the Supreme Court became a High Court. In 2003, in terms of the Interim Rationalisation of Jurisdiction of High Courts Act, 2001, the area of jurisdiction of the Cape High Court was modified to coincide with the boundaries of the Western Cape province. The Renaming of High Courts Act, 2008 renamed it to the "Western Cape High Court, Cape Town". In 2013, in the restructuring brought about by the Superior Courts Act, it became the Western Cape Division of the High Court of South Africa.

Judges 
The Western Cape Division has a complement of 31 judges. Judges are addressed as "the Honourable Justice", or just "My Lord" or "My Lady".  the judges are:

 John Hlophe (Judge President)
 Jeanette Traverso (Deputy JP)
 Rosheni Allie
 Elizabeth Baartman
 Ashley Binns-Ward
 André Blignault
 Leonard Bozalek
 Dennis Davis
 Siraj Desai
 Daniel Dlodlo
 Nathan Erasmus
 Chantal Fortuin
 Burton Fourie
 Patric Gamble
 Patricia Goliath
 Barend Griesel
 Robert Henney
 Andre le Grange
 Willem Louw
 Shenaaz Meer
 Tandazwa Ndita
 Vincent Saldanha
 Monde Samela
 Elize Steyn
 Anton Veldhuizen
 Basheer Waglay
 James Yekiso
 Dumisani Zondi

There are currently five vacant seats on the Bench.

Circuits 
The rural districts of the Western Cape, outside of the Cape Town metropolitan area, are divided into circuits. Judges of the division travel the circuits at least twice a year.

 The Western Circuit sits in Vredendal and Vanrhynsdorp, and hears cases from the West Coast.
 The Northern Circuit sits in Worcester and Beaufort West, and hears cases from the upper Breede River Valley and the Great Karoo.
 The Eastern Circuit sits in George, Mossel Bay, Knysna and Oudtshoorn, and hears cases from the Garden Route and the Little Karoo.
 The Southern Circuit sits in Swellendam and hears cases from the Overberg and the lower Breede River Valley.
 The Cape Circuit sits in Paarl and Stellenbosch, and hears only criminal cases from the Boland and the Helderberg.

References

External links 
 Decisions of the Western Cape Division

High Court of South Africa
High Court
Cape Town
1828 establishments in the Cape Colony
Courts and tribunals established in 1828